Solon Toothaker Kimball (August 12, 1909 – October 12, 1982) was a noted educator and anthropologist. Kimball was born and raised in Manhattan, Kansas. He graduated from Kansas State University in 1930, then received a master's degree and Ph.D in social anthropology from Harvard in 1933 and 1936.

Kimball did groundbreaking anthropology work concerning family and community in rural Ireland (with Conrad Arensberg) and on the Navajo reservation in the American Southwest. Over the years, he was on the faculty of a number of universities, including the University of California, Columbia University, the University of Alabama, and the University of Florida. While in Alabama in the 1950s, Kimball studied social tension arising from racial segregation and found himself labelled an "academic radical."

Kimball was a founding member of the Society for Applied Anthropology, president of the American Ethnological Society, and he was instrumental in the establishment in 1978 of the Zora Neale Hurston Fellowship Award Fund, which honors outstanding African-American graduates in the field of anthropology. Kimball was rewarded for his work with a Guggenheim Fellowship in 1966.

The American Anthropological Association now administers a Solon T. Kimball Award every other year to an anthropologist that effects change in public policy. The Kimball Award was initiated by royalties from Applied Anthropology in America (1978), a volume dedicated to Kimball, "who taught that the study of human behavior should be of service to people."

External links
American Anthropological Association awards
Solon Toothaker Kimball Papers at the Newberry Library

1909 births
1982 deaths
People from Manhattan, Kansas
Kansas State University alumni
Harvard University alumni
University of California, Berkeley faculty
Columbia University faculty
University of Alabama faculty
University of Florida faculty
20th-century American anthropologists